Lu Zhankui was a Mongol officer under the Manchuria based warlord Zhang Zuolin. In 1917, he was responsible for negotiations with the Chinese government on behalf of his Independence Army, the Dulidui. He was instrumental in bringing Oomoto leader Onisaburo Deguchi, and Aikido founder Morihei Ueshiba, to Mongolia in 1924, but was captured along with them and executed by firing squad in Tongliao.

References

People of the Chinese Civil War